Richard Donner (born Richard Donald Schwartzberg; April 24, 1930 – July 5, 2021) was an American filmmaker whose notable works included some of the most financially-successful films during the New Hollywood era. According to film historian Michael Barson, Donner was "one of Hollywood's most reliable makers of action blockbusters". His career spanned over 50 years, crossing multiple genres and filmmaking trends.

Donner began his career in 1957 as a television director. In the 1960s, Donner directed episodes of the series The Rifleman, The Man from U.N.C.L.E., The Fugitive, The Twilight Zone, The Banana Splits, and many others. He made his film debut with the low-budget aviation drama X-15 in 1961, but had his critical and commercial breakthrough with the horror film The Omen in 1976. He directed the landmark superhero film Superman in 1978, which provided an inspiration for the fantasy film genre to eventually gain artistic respectability and commercial dominance. Donner later went on to direct films in the 1980s such as The Goonies and Scrooged, while reinvigorating the buddy cop film genre with the Lethal Weapon series.

Donner and his wife Lauren owned their production company The Donners' Company (formerly Donner/Shuler Donner Productions), best known for co- executive producing the Free Willy and X-Men franchises. Donner also produced the Tales from the Crypt television series and co-wrote several comic books for Superman publisher DC Comics. In 2000, Donner received the President's Award from the Academy of Science Fiction, Fantasy & Horror Films.

Early years
Richard Donald Schwartzberg was born in the Bronx, New York City, to Russian Jewish parents, Hattie (Horowitz) and Fred Schwartzberg. His father owned a small furniture-manufacturing business and his mother was a stay at home mother. He had a sister, Joan. His grandfather owned a movie theatre in Brooklyn, which had an early influence on his perception of film.

After graduating from high school, Donner served in the U.S. Navy, becoming an aerial photographer. He briefly attended New York University but left to pursue a career in acting, relocating to Los Angeles and adopting the stage name "Richard Donner".

Television
Initially, Donner wanted to develop a career as an actor. He gained a bit part in a television program directed by Martin Ritt, who encouraged Donner to become a director instead. Ritt hired Donner as his assistant. Later, Donner was on the staff of Desilu, where he directed commercials. He made the transition into television dramas in the late 1950s, directing some episodes of the Steve McQueen western serial Wanted Dead or Alive and the Chuck Connors western The Rifleman.

During his early career as a director he worked on over twenty-five television series, including  Have Gun – Will Travel, The Fugitive, Combat!, Get Smart, The Man from U.N.C.L.E., The Wild Wild West, Gilligan's Island, Kojak, and The Twilight Zone (such as the episodes "Nightmare at 20,000 Feet" starring William Shatner and "From Agnes—With Love" starring Wally Cox), as well as the serial Danger Island from the children's program The Banana Splits.

In the 1990s, Donner served as executive producer of the HBO anthology horror series Tales from the Crypt, based on the EC Comics series of the same name. He directed three episodes during its run ("Dig That Cat... He's Real Gone", "The Ventriloquist's Dummy", "Showdown"), and also produced three feature film spinoffs; Demon Knight, Bordello of Blood, and Ritual.

Films
Donner's first feature film was X-15 (1961), which starred David McLean, Charles Bronson, and Mary Tyler Moore. Seven years passed before he directed his next, Salt and Pepper (1968), with Sammy Davis Jr., and Peter Lawford. His breakthrough film was The Omen (1976). A supernatural horror made in the wake of the success of The Exorcist, the film stars Gregory Peck, David Warner, and Lee Remick. It was the fifth-highest-grossing film of 1976.

Superman (1978)
In 1978, Donner directed Superman: The Movie, starring Christopher Reeve in the title role. Donner approached the film with the concept of creating verisimilitude, an intuitive feeling in the audience evoked that makes the fantasy story feel real within the story's context. It was a hit worldwide, projecting Reeve to international fame. The film co-starred Margot Kidder as Lois Lane, Marlon Brando as Jor-El, and Gene Hackman as archvillain Lex Luthor. At the box office, it grossed $134 million domestically.

Principal photography of Superman included filming of its first sequel, Superman II. Donner filmed most of Superman II with the expectation he would complete the sequel after the release of Superman. Despite the first film's success, Donner was fired from Superman II. Throughout the filming of both Superman films, Donner had a difficult relationship with executive producers Alexander Salkind and Ilya Salkind and producer Pierre Spengler. The Salkinds refused Donner's demand that Spengler be fired; instead, the Salkinds replaced Donner as director of Superman II with Richard Lester, who had worked with the Salkinds on The Three Musketeers and The Four Musketeers and as an uncredited producer on Superman. Following Donner's dismissal, Marlon Brando's scenes were removed from Superman II and much of the film was re-shot under Lester's direction. Gene Hackman refused to return for re-shoots; consequently, all the Lex Luthor scenes that appear in Superman II were filmed by Donner, although Donner refused to be credited.

Rotten Tomatoes' summary states that "Superman II meets, if not exceeds, the standard set by its predecessor." Donner continued to promote the view that his contribution was superior to the rest of the series. Superman II: The Richard Donner Cut was released on November 28, 2006, the same date as the DVD release of the summer film Superman Returns. This version of the film features the re-insertion of Marlon Brando's scenes as Jor-El and relies on a minimum of footage shot by Richard Lester.

Post-Superman career

Donner directed mixed commercial flops (Inside Moves, Radio Flyer) and successes (The Goonies, the Lethal Weapon series, Scrooged, and Conspiracy Theory). In the case of Superman, it was Donner who insisted the subject of the comic book superhero should be treated "straight", that is, portrayed with respect to the fantasy genre's particular conventions and tone, rather than "camp"; this approach strongly influenced later genre directors such as Tim Burton (Batman, Batman Returns), Bryan Singer (X-Men, X2, X-Men: Days of Future Past), Christopher Nolan (Batman Begins, The Dark Knight, The Dark Knight Rises), Kevin Feige (Marvel Cinematic Universe), and Zack Snyder (Man of Steel, Batman v Superman: Dawn of Justice, Zack Snyder's Justice League), who have made successful superhero films of their own.

Lethal Weapon (1987–1998)
Donner's next blockbuster film was the action comedy Lethal Weapon, written by Shane Black. It starred Mel Gibson as a widowed narcotics detective with a suicidal bent "who breaks every rule for the sheer joy of it". It co-starred Danny Glover as a calm homicide detective with a loving family and consideration for retirement. The film's action sequences were considered "truly spectacular" and made the film one of the year's biggest hits.

Donner directed six films starring Mel Gibson in total, creating a Lethal Weapon franchise with three sequels; the last of these was Lethal Weapon 4, released in 1998. In an interview in 2000, Gibson described his impressions of Donner:

Uncle Dick. He's a great guy, just terrific. Extremely professional. He's an old veteran and has an understanding of film that is the culmination of years of experience. He's got his technical stuff down, his vision down. No matter what you say about Dick, it underrates him. He really loves what he's doing, loves working with actors, and he allows you freedom to explore all kinds of areas. "All right, kid," he'll say, and slap you on the back and let you try something, because even he doesn't know sometimes. He's just an extremely charming, talented, great fuckin' guy. I love him.

X-Men
Donner became the executive producer for the 2000 Marvel Comics film X-Men, then also an executive producer for the 2009 X-Men prequel, X-Men Origins: Wolverine. In addition, Donner's wife has produced all of the films in the X-Men film series under their Donners' Company brand.

On October 16, 2008, Donner and Lauren Shuler Donner received stars in a double ceremony on the Hollywood Walk of Fame for their achievements in motion pictures, located at 6712 Hollywood Boulevard.

Unrealized projects 
Donner was the first choice to direct the "unofficial" James Bond film Never Say Never Again, but turned it down after he decided he disliked Lorenzo Semple Jr's script. He would have served as director of Jurassic Park had Columbia/TriStar won the bidding war for the screen rights against other studios. Donner was also considered as director for The Lost Boys, The Last Boy Scout, Memoirs of an Invisible Man, Dave, Forever Young, and The Sandlot. In 2001, Donner claimed he planned to direct a sequel to The Goonies after Timeline, and he planned to direct the fifth and final Lethal Weapon film before his death in 2021.

Books
 Action Comics (co-writer with Geoff Johns)
 Last Son and Escape from Bizarro World (2009)
 You're the Director... You Figure It Out: The Life and Films of Richard Donner (2010)

Comic books 
One of Donner's assistants in the late 1990s was comic book writer Geoff Johns. In October 2006, Donner, Johns, and artist Adam Kubert became the new creative team on Action Comics, the publisher's most time honored publication and one of DC Comics' two main Superman titles. Together, Johns and Donner collaborated on the stories Last Son and Escape from Bizarro World, both of which have been released in collected book form. Donner and Johns also co-wrote a story for Action Comics #1000, released in April 2018.

Biography 
In 2010, Donner's authorized biography titled You're the Director... You Figure It Out: The Life and Films of Richard Donner by James Christie was published by BearManor Media. The book features a foreword by Mel Gibson.

Script Magazine described the book as an "engaging portrait of a warm-hearted (if occasionally gruff) man who can justly be considered the modern equivalent of Victor Fleming and Michael Curtiz – a highly talented, professional director of motion pictures who has thrived in the studio system and made some pretty good pictures to boot."

The Directors Guild of America called the book "a compelling study of an ebullient, ballsy risk-taker who was a director even before he was aware of it" that "ably captures Donner's joy in doing a job he loves."

Personal life and death 
Donner married film producer Lauren Shuler on November 27, 1985. The two merged their respective production companies to create Shuler-Donner Productions (now The Donners' Company) the same year. Donner and Shuler remained together until the former's death.

Donner was a cousin of actor Steve Kahan, who played a policeman tracking Otis in Superman: The Movie, and played Captain Ed Murphy in the Lethal Weapon film franchise. Donner also cast Kahan in some of his other films.

Donner died on July 5, 2021, at his West Hollywood, California home, at the age of 91. The cause of death was heart failure with atherosclerosis as an underlying cause.

Filmography

Film 

Executive producer
 Omen III: The Final Conflict (1981)
 The Lost Boys (1987)
 Delirious (1991)
 Free Willy (1993)
 Free Willy 2: The Adventure Home (1995)
 Tales from the Crypt: Demon Knight (1995)
 Tales from the Crypt: Bordello of Blood (1996)
 Free Willy 3: The Rescue (1997)
 Any Given Sunday (1999)
 X-Men (2000)
 X-Men Origins: Wolverine (2009)

Television

Awards and nominations

References

External links

 
 Archive of American Television interview, 2006
 

1930 births
2021 deaths
American comics writers
Film producers from New York (state)
American Jews
American television directors
Film directors from New York City
Hugo Award winners
American male television writers
Action film directors
Horror film directors
American film producers
American television producers
Television producers from New York City
Deaths from atherosclerosis
United States Navy sailors
Deaths from congestive heart failure